Giovanni "Nino" Benvenuti (born 26 April 1938) is an Italian former professional boxer and actor. He held world titles in two weight classes, having held the undisputed super-welterweight championship from June 1965 to June 1966 and the undisputed middleweight championship twice, from April to September 1967, and from March 1968 to November 1970. As an amateur welterweight boxer he won the Italian title in 1956–60, the European title in 1957 and 1959, and an Olympic gold medal in 1960, receiving the Val Barker trophy for boxing style. In 1961, having an amateur record of 120-0, he turned professional and won world titles in the light-middleweight division and twice in the middleweight division. Near the end of his boxing career he appeared in two Italian films, Sundance and the Kid (1969) and then in Mark Shoots First (1975).

Inducted into the International Boxing Hall of Fame in 1992. He currently ranks No.32 in BoxRec's ranking of the greatest pound for pound boxers of all time. In 1968, Benvenuti was voted Fighter of the Year by The Ring magazine. In 2011, The Ring magazine ranked him as seventh on their list of the "10 best middleweight title holders of the last 50 years."

Professional boxing career

On 20 January 1961, Benvenuti made his professional boxing debut, beating Ben Ali Allala by decision in six rounds. He then won 29 fights in a row before challenging for the Italian middleweight title, on 1 March 1963, in Rome against Tommaso Truppi. His winning streak extended to 30 when he knocked out Truppi in round eleven. His winning streak reached 46 wins in a row when he met former world junior middleweight champion Denny Moyer on 18 September 1964, beating Moyer on points in ten rounds.

After reaching 55 wins in a row, including a five-round knockout of Truppi in a rematch, he met world jr. middleweight champion Sandro Mazzinghi in Milan, on 18 June 1965. This was a fight the Italian public clamored for: both men were Italian, both men claimed to be the best in their division, and they had expressed desire to fight each other. Benvenuti became the world junior middleweight champion with a sixth-round knockout win. It was common, at that era, for world champions to fight for regional belts after winning the world title, so on 15 October 1965, he added the European belt at the middleweight division, with a sixth-round knockout of Luis Folledo.

A rematch with Mazzinghi took place on 17 December 1965, and Benvenuti retained the world junior middleweight crown after winning a fifteen-round decision. After three non-title wins, including a twelve-round decision over Don Fullmer and a fourteen-round knockout in Germany of Jupp Elze (Benvenuti's first professional fight abroad), he travelled to South Korea, where he lost his world junior middleweight title against Ki-Soo Kim, who won by decision in fifteen rounds on 25 June 1966, breaking Benvenuti's record of 65 consecutive wins. Frustrated by what he perceived as an unjust decision to favour the local boxer, Benvenuti decided to drop the junior middleweight and concentrate on the middleweight division instead.

Benvenuti beat Emile Griffith by decision in fifteen rounds at New York City's Madison Square Garden on 17 April 1967, in what was the beginning of their trilogy of fights, to win the world middleweight title. On a rematch at Shea Stadium on 29 September 1967, he lost by a decision in fifteen rounds.

On 4 March 1968, Benvenuti and Griffith completed their trilogy, once again at Madison Square Garden, with Benvenuti knocking Griffith down in round nine and winning a fifteen-round decision to regain the world middleweight title. On 14 December 1968, in San Remo, he and Fullmer met once again, and Benvenuti retained the world middleweight title with a fifteen-round decision. On 26 May 1969, Benvenuti lost a ten round decision to former world light heavyweight champion Dick Tiger in a light heavyweight, non-title match. Benvenuti broke his right hand while landing a head punch in the first round, but chose to continue fighting "like a cripple" rather than quit.

The most curious defense of Benvenuti's active reign, took place on 4 October 1969, when he retained the world middleweight title with a seven-round disqualification win over American Fraser Scott at the Stadio S. Paolo in Naples. From the first round, Scott was warned repeatedly, and with increasing intensity from the referee, about attempted butting. Scott, a young fighter unschooled in the European insistence on what his trainer referred to as "that...Olympic stand-up style", knowing only the battle plan he went in with and speaking no Italian, did not understand the warnings at first, then was unable to alter his approach; to the American, he was merely "ducking" Benvenuti's shots. The bout was foul-filled even without this added controversy; Scott would later accuse Benvenuti of having tried to thumb him, and during the sixth round, the fighters' legs became entangled as they wrestled, causing both to crash to the canvas. Round seven saw the stoppage, the referee asserting "attempted butting", Fraser Scott and corner forever insisting he had "ducked".

On 22 November 1969, he beat former world welterweight champion Luis Rodriguez by knockout in 11 rounds to, once again, retain his world middleweight title.

On 13 March 1970, in a non-title bout, Benvenuti was knocked out in the eighth round by unknown American Tom Bethea in Australia. The upset defeat caused Bethea to earn a world title shot at Benvenuti's title. Benvenuti avenged the defeat when the two met again in Umag with an eighth-round knockout. 

On 7 November 1970 Benvenuti lost his title in Rome after being knocked out in round twelve by rising star Carlos Monzón.

In 1971, after losing a ten-round decision to José Chirino, a fighter he had picked due to his fighting style's similarities with Monzón, Benvenuti got a rematch with Monzón for the world middleweight title in Monte Carlo on 8 May 1971. Monzón won again in round three when Benvenuti‘s corner threw in the towel. Realizing that he no longer had the stamina to compete with champions of a new generation like Monzón, Benvenuti announced his retirement. 

Benvenuti had a record of 82 wins, 7 losses and 1 draw (tie) in 90 professional boxing bouts, with 35 wins by knockout. In 1992 he was inducted into the International Boxing Hall of Fame.

Post-boxing
After retiring from boxing Benvenuti became a successful businessman, TV pundit and city counselor for sport in Trieste. He opened a high-class restaurant and maintained a strong friendship with his former rivals Monzón and Griffith. In 1980 Benvenuti asked Griffith to be the godfather of one of his sons, and later helped him financially when Griffith was in trouble. Monzón was a guest at Benvenuti's television show several times, and, when he was accused of murdering his wife in 1988, Benvenuti became one of his most loyal supporters, visiting him in jail in Argentina. Benvenuti was a pallbearer at Monzón’s funeral in 1995.

Retirement and personal life

Nino Benvenuti was born in Isola d'Istria, at that time in Italy (now in Slovenia). After the war his family fled to Italy due to the consequences of the war treaty and the hostilities created by the Yugoslav government.

In 1961 Benvenuti married Giuliana Fonzari; they had four sons and adopted a Tunisian girl. They later divorced, and Benvenuti married Nadia Bertorello, with whom he had one daughter.

Professional boxing record

Awards
On 7 May 2015, in the presence of the President of Italian National Olympic Committee (CONI), Giovanni Malagò, was inaugurated in the Olympic Park of the Foro Italico in Rome, along Viale delle Olimpiadi, the Walk of Fame of Italian sport, consisting of 100 tiles that chronologically report names of the most representative athletes in the history of Italian sport. On each tile are the name of the sportsman, the sport in which he distinguished himself and the symbol of CONI. One of the tiles is dedicated to Nino Benvenuti.

See also
Legends of Italian sport - Walk of Fame
List of world light-middleweight boxing champions
List of world middleweight boxing champions

References

Bibliography

External links
 
 
   

1938 births
Living people
Italian male boxers
Medalists at the 1960 Summer Olympics
Boxers at the 1960 Summer Olympics
Olympic medalists in boxing
International Boxing Hall of Fame inductees
Light-middleweight boxers
Middleweight boxers
Olympic boxers of Italy
Olympic gold medalists for Italy
European Boxing Union champions
World Boxing Association champions
World Boxing Council champions
The Ring (magazine) champions
World light-middleweight boxing champions
World middleweight boxing champions
Istrian Italian people
People from Izola